Acanthosaura nataliae is a species of agama found in Vietnam and Laos.

References

nataliae
Reptiles of Vietnam
Reptiles of Laos
Reptiles described in 2006
Taxa named by Nikolai Loutseranovitch Orlov